The 18th PMPC Star Awards for Television took place at the Aliw Theater, Pasay, Philippines on October 23, 2004 and was broadcast on RPN Channel 9 on Saturday Night Playhouse. The awards night was hosted by Lorna Tolentino, Boy Abunda and Piolo Pascual.

Nominees 
These are the nominations for the 18th Star Awards for Television. The winners are in bold.

Best TV Station 
ABS-CBN-2
NBN-4
ABC-5
GMA-7
RPN-9
IBC-13
Studio 23

Best Primetime Drama Series 
Basta't Kasama Kita (ABS-CBN 2)
It Might Be You (ABS-CBN 2)
Kay Tagal Kang Hinintay (ABS-CBN 2)
Marina (ABS-CBN 2)
Sana'y Wala Nang Wakas (ABS-CBN 2)
Te Amo, Maging Sino Ka Man (GMA 7)

Best Daytime Drama Series 
Daisy Siete (GMA 7)
Ikaw sa Puso Ko (GMA 7)
Mangarap Ka (ABS-CBN 2)
Sarah the Teen Princess (ABS-CBN 2)
Stage 1: The StarStruck Playhouse (GMA 7)
Walang Hanggan (GMA 7)

Best Drama Actor 
John Lloyd Cruz (It Might Be You / ABS-CBN 2)
Christopher de Leon (Hanggang Kailan / GMA 7)
Eddie Garcia (Narito Ang Puso Ko / GMA 7)
Richard Gomez (Ang Iibigin Ay Ikaw Pa Rin / GMA 7)
Diether Ocampo (Sana'y Wala Nang Wakas / ABS-CBN 2)
Piolo Pascual (Mangarap Ka / ABS-CBN 2)
Jericho Rosales (Sana'y Wala Nang Wakas / ABS-CBN 2)

Best Drama Actress 
Bea Alonzo (It Might Be You / ABS-CBN 2)
Claudine Barretto (Marina / ABS-CBN 2)
Dina Bonnevie (Narito Ang Puso Ko / GMA 7)
Malou de Guzman (Marina / ABS-CBN 2)
Gloria Romero (Sana'y Wala Nang Wakas / ABS-CBN 2)
Judy Ann Santos (Basta't Kasama Kita / ABS-CBN 2)
Lorna Tolentino (Hanggang Kailan / GMA 7)

Best Drama Anthology 
Maalaala Mo Kaya (ABS-CBN 2)
Magpakailanman (GMA 7)

Best Single Performance by an Actress 
Nora Aunor (Magpakailanman: Silang Mga Inihabilin ng Langit / GMA 7)
Sunshine Dizon (Magpakailanman: Silang Mga Inihabilin ng Langit / GMA 7)
Moreen Guese (Maalaala Mo Kaya: The Fatima Soriano Story / ABS-CBN 2)
Maricel Laxa (Maalaala Mo Kaya: School Bus / ABS-CBN 2)
Ara Mina (Magpakailanman: Kapag Ang Pag-ibig ay Wagas / GMA 7)
Zsa Zsa Padilla (Maalaala Mo Kaya: Police Car / ABS-CBN 2)
Eula Valdez (Maalaala Mo Kaya: Karinderya / ABS-CBN 2)

Best Single Performance by an Actor 
Goyong (Maalaala Mo Kaya: Police Car / ABS-CBN 2) 
Jhong Hilario (Maalaala Mo Kaya: Yellow Baby / ABS-CBN 2) 
Albert Martinez (Maalaala Mo Kaya: School Bus / ABS-CBN 2) 
Long Mejia (Maalaala Mo Kaya: Lugaw / ABS-CBN 2) 
Roderick Paulate (Maalaala Mo Kaya: Bituin ABS-CBN 2) 
Ronaldo Valdez (Maalaala Mo Kaya: Upuan / ABS-CBN 2)

Best New Male TV Personality 
Mark Bautista (Sarah, The Teen Princess / ABS-CBN 2) 
Joseph Bitangcol (Maalaala Mo Kaya: Barbecue / ABS-CBN 2) 
Rainier Castillo (Click / GMA 7) 
Gabb Drilon (Marina / ABS-CBN 2) 
Mark Herras (Click / GMA 7) 
Dion Ignacio (Stage 1: The StarStruck Playhouse: Luvsick @ Heart / GMA 7)
Raphael Martinez (MTB: Ang Saya Saya! / ABS-CBN 2) 
Erik Santos (ASAP Mania / ABS-CBN 2)

Best New Female TV Personality 
Bettina Carlos (Kakabakaba Adventures / GMA 7)
Rachelle Ann Go (ASAP Mania / ABS-CBN 2)
Yasmien Kurdi (Click / GMA 7) 
Katherine Luna (It Might Be You / ABS-CBN 2) 
Pauleen Luna (Marina / ABS-CBN 2)
Neri Naig (Maalaala Mo Kaya: Salamin / ABS-CBN 2) 
Cristine Reyes (Stage 1: The StarStruck Playhouse: My First Romance / GMA 7) 
Maja Salvador (It Might Be You / ABS-CBN 2)

Best Gag Show 
Bubble Gang (GMA 7)
The Misadventures of Maverick and Ariel (ABC 5) 
Nuts Entertainment (GMA 7) 
Wazzup Wazzup (Studio 23) 
Wow Mali (ABC 5) 
Yes Yes Show (ABS-CBN 2)

Best Comedy Show 
Ang Tanging Ina (ABS-CBN 2) 
Bida si Mister, Bida si Misis (ABS-CBN 2) 
Daddy Di Do Du (GMA 7)
Idol Ko Si Kap (GMA 7) 
Lagot Ka, Isusumbong Kita (GMA 7) 
OK Fine, Whatever (ABS-CBN 2)

Best Comedy Actor 
Ogie Alcasid (Bubble Gang / GMA 7)
Joey de Leon (Nuts Entertainment / GMA 7) 
Edu Manzano (OK Fine, Whatever / ABS-CBN 2) 
Vhong Navarro (Bida si Mister, Bida si Misis / ABS-CBN 2) 
Vic Sotto (Daddy Di Do Du / GMA 7) 
Michael V. (Bubble Gang / GMA 7)

Best Comedy Actress 
Ai-Ai delas Alas (Ang Tanging Ina / ABS-CBN 2) 
Ethel Booba (All Together Now / GMA 7) 
Toni Gonzaga (Lagot Ka Isusumbong Kita / GMA 7) 
Rufa Mae Quinto (Bubble Gang / GMA 7)
Maricel Soriano (Bida si Mister, Bida si Misis / ABS-CBN 2) 
Nova Villa (Home Along Da Airport/ABS-CBN 2)

Best Musical Variety Show 
ASAP Mania (ABS-CBN 2)
SOP Rules (GMA-7)
Master Showman Presents (GMA 7)

Best Variety Show 
Eat Bulaga! (GMA 7)
Its Chowtime! (IBC 13)
MTB: Ang Saya Saya! (ABS-CBN 2)

Best Female TV Host 
Ai Ai delas Alas (MTB: Ang Saya Saya! / ABS-CBN 2) 
Mickey Ferriols (MTB: Ang Saya Saya! / ABS-CBN 2) 
Toni Rose Gayda (Eat Bulaga! / GMA 7)
Jaya (SOP Rules / GMA 7) 
Zsa Zsa Padilla (ASAP Mania / ABS-CBN 2)
Regine Velasquez (SOP Rules / GMA 7)

Best Male TV Host 
Carlos Agassi (ASAP Mania / ABS-CBN 2) 
Ogie Alcasid (SOP Rules / GMA 7) 
Joey de Leon (Eat Bulaga! / GMA 7) 
Luis Manzano (ASAP Mania / ABS-CBN 2) 
Edu Manzano (MTB: Ang Saya Saya! / ABS-CBN 2) 
German Moreno (Master Showman Presents / GMA 7) 
Vic Sotto (Eat Bulaga! /GMA 7)
Gary Valenciano (ASAP Mania / ABS-CBN 2)

Best Public Service Program 
Emergency (GMA 7) 
Imbestigador (GMA 7) 
Private-I (ABS-CBN 2) 
Simpleng Hiling (ABS-CBN 2) 
Wish Ko Lang (GMA 7)

Best Public Service Program Host 
Gus Abelgas (Private-I / ABS-CBN 2) 
Arnold Clavio (Emergency / GMA 7) 
Mike Enriquez (Imbestigador / GMA 7) 
Vicky Morales (Wish Ko Lang / GMA 7)
Bernadette Sembrano (Lukso ng Dugo / ABS-CBN 2) 
Raffy Tulfo (Problema Mo, Sagot Ko / ABC 5)

Best Horror-Fantasy Program 
Kakabakaba Adventures (GMA 7) 
Nginiig (ABS-CBN 2)
Wansapanataym (ABS-CBN 2)

Best Reality Competition Program 
Extra Challenge (GMA 7)
Trip Kita (ABS-CBN 2) 
To The Max (ABS-CBN 2) 
Singles (ABC 5)

Best Reality Competition Program Host 
Phoemela Barranda, Paolo Bediones and Ethel Booba (Extra Challenge / GMA 7)
Dominic Ochoa (Trip Kita / ABS-CBN 2) 
Marvin Agustin, Juddha Paolo and Rica Peralejo (To The Max / ABS-CBN 2)

Best Game Show 
Digital LG Quiz (GMA 7) 
Next Level Na, Game KNB? (ABS-CBN 2) 
K! The 1 Million Peso Videoke Challenge (GMA 7)
Puso o Pera (ABC 5) 
Sing Galing (ABC 5)

Best Game Show Host 
Ai Ai delas Alas and John Lapus (Sing Galing / ABC 5) 
Kris Aquino (Next Level Na, Game KNB? / ABS-CBN 2) 
Paolo Bediones and Pia Guanio (Digital LG Quiz / GMA 7) 
Jaya and Allan K. (K! The 1 Million Peso Videoke Challenge / GMA 7)
Willie Revillame (Puso o Pera / ABC 5)

Best Talent Search Program 
Search for a Star (GMA 7) 
Star Circle Quest (ABS-CBN 2)
Star In A Million (ABS-CBN 2) 
StarStruck (GMA 7)
StarStruck Kids (GMA 7)

Best Talent Search Program Host 
Ryan Agoncillo, Edu Manzano and Zsa Zsa Padilla (Star In A Million / ABS-CBN 2)
Nancy Castiglione and Dingdong Dantes (StarStruck / GMA 7)
Jolina Magdangal (StarStruck Kids / GMA 7)
Luis Manzano and Jodi Sta. Maria (Star Circle Quest / ABS-CBN 2)
Regine Velasquez (Search For A Star / GMA 7)

Best Youth Oriented Program 
Berks (ABS-CBN 2) 
Click (GMA 7)
Love to Love (GMA 7)

Best Educational Program 
Ating Alamin (IBC 13) 
Kumikitang Kabuhayan (ABS-CBN 2) 
Lakas Magsasaka (GMA 7) 
Ricky Reyes Beauty Plus (RPN 9)

Best Educational Program Host 
Gerry Geronimo (Ating Alamin / IBC 13) 
Peter Musñgi (Kumi-Kitang Kabuhayan / ABS-CBN 2) 
Ricky Reyes (Ricky Reyes Beauty Plus / RPN 9)
Albert Sumaya (Lakas Magsasaka / GMA 7)

Best Celebrity Talk Show 
Celebrity Turns (GMA 7)
Morning Girls with Kris and Korina (ABS-CBN 2)
Partners Mel and Jay (GMA 7) 
Sharon (ABS-CBN 2) 
Sis (GMA 7)

Best Celebrity Talk Show Host 
Kris Aquino and Korina Sanchez (Morning Girls with Kris and Korina / ABS-CBN 2)
Sharon Cuneta (Sharon / ABS-CBN 2)
Janice de Belen and Gelli de Belen (Sis / GMA 7) 
Lani Misalucha and Michael V. (Celebrity Turns / GMA 7) 
Jay Sonza and Mel Tiangco (Partners Mel and Jay / GMA 7)

Best Documentary Program 
i-Witness (GMA 7)
The Correspondents (ABS-CBN 2) 
The Probe Team Documentaries (ABC 5)

Best Documentary Program Host 
Kara David, Vicky Morales, Maki Pulido, Howie Severino and Jay Taruc (i-Witness / GMA 7)
Karen Davila and Abner Mercado (The Correspondents / ABS-CBN 2) 
Che Che Lazaro (The Probe Team Documentaries / ABC 5)

Best Documentary Special 
50 Taong Ligawan: The Pinoy TV History (ABS-CBN 2)
Papogi: The Imaging of Philippine Presidents (ABS-CBN 2) 
Walang Bakas (GMA 7)

Best Magazine Show 
Jessica Soho Reports (GMA 7)
Kontrobersyal (ABS-CBN 2)
Magandang Gabi, Bayan (ABS-CBN 2) 
Pipol (ABS-CBN 2) 
Special Assignment (ABS-CBN 2)

Best Magazine Show Host 
Boy Abunda (Kontrobersyal / ABS-CBN 2)
Katherine de Castro and Erwin Tulfo (Magandang Gabi Bayan / ABS-CBN 2) 
Ces Oreña-Drilon (Pipol / ABS-CBN 2)
Jessica Soho (Jessica Soho Reports / GMA 7)
Luchi Cruz-Valdez (Special Assignment / ABS-CBN 2)

Best News Program 
24 Oras (GMA-7)
Big News (ABC 5)
IBC Express Balita (IBC 13) 
Insider (ABS-CBN 2) 
News Central (Studio 23) 
Saksi (GMA 7)
TV Patrol (ABS-CBN 2)

Best Male Newscaster 
Martin Andanar (Big News / ABC 5)
Julius Babao (TV Patrol / ABS-CBN 2) 
Cito Beltran (Insider / ABS-CBN 2) 
Arnold Clavio (Saksi / GMA 7) 
Mike Enriquez (24 Oras / GMA 7)

Best Female Newscaster 
Karen Davila (Insider / ABS-CBN 2) 
Precious Hipolito (IBC Express Balita / IBC 13)
Vicky Morales (Saksi / GMA 7) 
Korina Sanchez (TV Patrol / ABS-CBN 2)
Mel Tiangco (24 Oras / GMA 7)
Amelyn Veloso (Big News / ABC 5)

Best Morning Show 
Breakfast (Studio 23) 
Magandang Umaga, Bayan (ABS-CBN 2)
Unang Hirit (GMA 7)

Best Morning Show Host 
Ryan Agoncillo, Bam Aquino, Mariton Pacheco, Ria Tanjuatco-Trillo (Breakfast/Studio 23) 
Julius Babao, Christine Bersola-Babao, Niña Corpuz, Bernadette Sembrano, Erwin Tulfo and Company (Magandang Umaga Bayan/ABS-CBN 2)
Lyn Ching, Arnold Clavio, Suzi Entrata, Daniel Razon, Rhea Santos and Company (Unang Hirit/GMA 7)

Best Public Affairs Program 
A Second Look (RPN 9) 
Debate with Mare at Pare (GMA 7)
Direct Line (RPN 9) 
Dong Puno Live (ABS-CBN 2)

Best Public Affairs Program Host 
Jeffrey Espiritu, Roger Evasco and Marigold Haber (Direct Line / RPN 9)
Winnie Monsod and Oscar Orbos (Debate with Mare at Pare / GMA 7)
Anthony Pangilinan (A Second Look/RPN 9) 
Dong Puno (Dong Puno Live/ABS-CBN 2)

Best Showbiz Oriented Talk Show 
The Buzz (ABS-CBN 2) 
Celebrity DAT Com (IBC 13) 
S-Files (GMA 7) 
S2: Showbiz Sabado (ABS-CBN 2) 
Startalk (GMA 7)

Best Male Showbiz Oriented Talk Show Host 
Boy Abunda (The Buzz / ABS-CBN 2)
Paolo Bediones (S-Files / GMA 7) 
Butch Francisco (Startalk / GMA 7) 
Richard Gomez (S-Files / GMA 7) 
Edu Manzano (S2: Showbiz Sabado / ABS-CBN 2) 
Joey Marquez (S-Files / GMA 7)

Best Female Showbiz Oriented Talk Show Host 
Kris Aquino (The Buzz / ABS-CBN 2)
Janice de Belen (S-Files / GMA 7)
Dolly Ann Carvajal (Celebrity DAT Com / IBC 13) 
Cristy Fermin (S2: Showbiz Sabado / ABS-CBN 2) 
Rosanna Roces (Startalk / GMA 7) 
Lolit Solis (Startalk / GMA 7)

Best Children Show 
Art Is Kool (GMA 7)
Chikiting Patrol (GMA 7) 
Epol/Apol (ABS-CBN 2) 
Math-Tinik (ABS-CBN 2) 
Sineskwela (ABS-CBN 2)

Best Children Show Host 
Robert Alejandro (Art Is Kool / GMA 7)
Chikiting Patrol Kids (Chikiting Patrol / GMA 7) 
Marick Dacanay, Nina de Sagun, Toots Javellana and Bodjie Pascua (Epol/Apol/ ABS-CBN 2) 
Janus del Prado, Kristoffer Eursores and Hue Remulla (Math-Tinik / ABS-CBN 2) 
Sineskwela Hosts (Sineskwela / ABS-CBN 2)

Best Lifestyle Show 
All About You (GMA 7)
At Home Ka Dito (ABS-CBN 2)
F! (ABS-CBN 2)
Tahanang Pinoy (ABC 5)

Best Lifestyle Show Host 
Angel Aquino, Amanda Griffin and Daphne Oseña-Paez (F! / ABS-CBN 2)
Mikee Cojuangco (All About You / GMA 7) 
Charlene Gonzalez (At Home Ka Dito / ABS-CBN 2)
RJ Ledesma (Tahanang Pinoy / ABC 5) 
Lorna Tolentino (All About You / GMA 7)
Dawn Zulueta (All About You / GMA 7)

Best Woman Show 
A Taste of Life (IBC 13) 
Gourmet Everyday (ABC 5) 
Island Flavors (ABC 5)
Mommy Academy (IBC 13) 
Practical Cook (ABC 5)

Best Woman Show Host 
Gigi Angkao and Ayet Evangelista (Island Flavors/ABC 5)
Desiree Ching (Gourmet Everyday/ABC 5) 
Nancy Reyes- Lumen (Practical Cook/ABC 5) 
Chiqui Roa-Puno (Mommy Academy/ABC 5) 
Heny Sison (A Taste of Life/IBC 13)

Special awards

Star Award for Broadcasting Excellence
Bong Lapira

Face of the Night
Jodi Sta. Maria

Stars of the Night
Piolo Pascual (Male)
Kristine Hermosa (Female)

See also
PMPC Star Awards for TV

References

PMPC Star Awards for Television